The Jerusalem Institute for Market Studies (JIMS) is an independent, nonprofit economic policy think tank whose mission is to promote social progress in Israel through economic freedom and individual liberty.

JIMS, founded in 2003, regularly publishes influential economic policy papers and editorials, runs a number of innovative educational projects, and administers a unique national public opinion survey called the Israel Panel Study of Opinion Dynamics (IPSOD).

Impact
The University of Pennsylvania's Think Tanks and Civil Societies Program ranked JIMS among the top five Israeli think tanks, out of over 50 considered, in both 2008 and 2009. The last two years also saw JIMS ranked among the top 25 think tanks in the Middle East and North Africa region, and among the top 400 most important public policy research organizations in the world. The Global Survey of Think Tanks evaluated over 5,000 think tanks worldwide.

Research Activities
JIMS houses three research centers, the Center for Data Analysis (CDA), the Center for Public Policy (CPP), and the Center for the Study of Judaism and Economics (CSJE).

 CDA calculates Israel Tax Freedom Day each year, publishes Israel's entry in the Economic Freedom of the World index, and administers the Israel Panel Study of Opinion Dynamics.
 CPP disseminates position papers to Israel's lawmakers and the general public on economic issues currently being debated in the Knesset. CPP's position papers are regularly cited in Knesset deliberations.
 CSJE is devoted to exploring the connection between Judaism and economic theory and policy. CSJE was inaugurated in November 2008 with a lecture on "Economics in the Talmud" by Professor Robert Aumann, the winner of the 2005 Nobel Prize in Economics.

Educational Activities
JIMS runs a number of innovative educational programs that are unique in Israel. For example, JIMS is the only educational institution in the country with an interdisciplinary seminar series on the principles of classical liberalism. Yearly fellowships are offered to university students that attend the seminars. In addition, JIMS has a monthly public lecture series and organizes workshops on economics and public policy for working professionals and high school students.

References

External links
 JIMS' Official Website
 JIMS' Official FaceBook Page
 JIMS' Official YouTube Page

Organizations based in Jerusalem
Think tanks based in Israel
Libertarian think tanks
2003 establishments in the United States